The 2008–2009 Women's CEV Champions League was an international volleyball club competition for elite clubs throughout Europe.

Teams of the 2008–2009
Participants:

Main phase

Pool A

|}

November 6, 2008

|}
November 12–13, 2008

|}
December 9–11, 2008

|}
December 17–18, 2008

|}
January 14–15, 2009

|}
January 20, 2009

|}

Pool B

|}
November 4–6, 2008

|}
November 12, 2008

|}
December 9, 2008

|}
December 17–18, 2008

|}
January 13–14, 2009

|}
January 20, 2009

|}

Pool C

|}
November 5–6, 2008

|}
November 11–12, 2008

|}
December 10–11, 2008

|}
December 16–17, 2008

|}
January 14–15, 2009

|}
January 20, 2009

|}

Pool D

|}
November 5, 2008

|}
November 11–12, 2008

|}
December 10–11, 2008

|}
December 16–17, 2008

|}
January 14, 2009

|}
January 20, 2009

|}

Pool E

|}
November 4–5, 2008

|}
November 11–12, 2008

|}
December 10, 2008

|}
December 17, 2008

|}
January 13–14, 2009

|}
January 20, 2009

|}

Play-offs

Playoffs 12

|}

First leg
February 11–12, 2009

|}

Second leg
February 18–19, 2009

|}

Playoffs 6

|}

First leg
March 4–5, 2009

|}

Second leg
March 11–12, 2009

|}

Final four
Perugia, Italy, 28 & 29 March 2009

Semi-finals
March 28, 2009

|}

3rd Place
March 29, 2009

|}

Final
March 29, 2009

|}

Final standing

Awards
Winners:
MVP:  Serena Ortolani (Volley Bergamo)
Best scorer:  Ekaterina Gamova (Dynamo Moscow)
Best spiker:  Simona Gioli (Dynamo Moscow)
Best server:  Lucia Crisanti (Colussi Sirio Perugia)
Best blocker:  Yevgeniya Dushkyevich (Colussi Sirio Perugia)
Best receiver:  Kim Willoughby (Colussi Sirio Perugia)
Best setter:  Irina Kirillova (Dynamo Moscow)
Best libero:  Enrica Merlo (Volley Bergamo)

References

External links
 Official site

CEV Women's Champions League
CEV Women's Champions League
CEV Women's Champions League